In mathematics, the Shimizu L-function, introduced by , is a Dirichlet series associated to a totally real algebraic number field.

defined the signature defect of the boundary of a manifold as the eta invariant, the value as s=0 of their eta function, and used this to show that Hirzebruch's signature defect of a cusp of a Hilbert modular surface can be expressed in terms of the value at s=0 or 1 of a Shimizu L-function.

Definition

Suppose that K is a totally real algebraic number field, M is a lattice in the field, and V is a subgroup of maximal rank of the group of totally positive units preserving the lattice. The Shimizu L-series is given by

References

Zeta and L-functions